Daniel Rivas Fernández (13 March 1988 – 19 July 2015) was a Spanish motorcycle racer. At international level, he competed in the European Superstock 600 Championship, the Superstock 1000 FIM Cup and the Moto2 World Championship. He died on 19 July 2015 along with Bernat Martínez due to injuries sustained in an accident in Laguna Seca.

Career statistics

Grand Prix motorcycle racing

By season

Races by year
(key)

References

External links

Spanish motorcycle racers
1988 births
2015 deaths
Moto2 World Championship riders
FIM Superstock 1000 Cup riders
Motorcycle racers who died while racing
Sportspeople from Moaña